Boettiger is a surname. Notable people with the surname include:

Clarence John Boettiger (1900–1950), American newspaperman and military officer
John Roosevelt Boettiger (born 1939), American developmental and clinical psychologist
Pepo (cartoonist) (1911—2000), Chilean cartoonist, real name Rene Ríos Boettiger